Kyo Kara Maoh! is a series of light novels written by Tomo Takabayashi and illustrated by Temari Matsumoto. It has been adapted into an anime and manga series.

Light novels 
Written by Tomo Takabayashi with illustrations by Temari Matsumoto. The first novel was released in November 2000 and so far there are 22 volumes in the series. 17 are considered to be main story novels and the other 5 are extras and side stories which provide background and other information to the story.

Manga 
The manga is released under the title Kyou Kara MA no Tsuku Jiyuugyou! in Japan. It is currently serialized in Asuka, a monthly magazine. Its production started in July 2005.

An English-language version of the manga was licensed by Tokyopop under the title Kyo Kara Maoh! and they released the first seven volumes but Tokyopop has since given up the license. Viz Media re-released the seven volumes of the series digitally under its Viz Select line.

Drama CDs

Anime Fanbooks
  December 22, 2005 
  December 20, 2006 
  May 28, 2009

Illustration book
㋮Illustrations April 8, 2009

Information Book
㋮本 Maru-ma Series Official Fan Book April 24, 2010

Radio Show
 

Theme song:
First Part: BACK2BACK by Mitsuki Saiga feat. JUST
Second Part: Heart shaped killing emotion by Mitsuki Saiga feat. JUST

Hosts: Mitsuki Saiga (Wolfram), Kouki Miyata (Murata), Takahiro Sakurai (Yuri) (from 7 he was a guest, from 9 he became a host)
    
Guests

Masako Katsuki(Cheri): Episodes 03, 04, 19, 20, 43, 44

Minami Takayama(Anissina): Episodes 03, 04, 19, 20, 43, 44

Kazuhiko Inoue(Gunter): Episodes 05, 06, 61, 62

Takashi Matsuyama(Dakoskos): Episodes 06, 37, 38

Masanori Takeda(Jozak): Episodes 09, 10, 41, 42

Yumi Kakazu(Miko Shibuya): Episodes 11, 12, 45, 46

Shin-ichiro Miki(The Original King): Episodes 13, 14, 39, 40

Masaki Terasoma(Adalbert): Episodes 15, 16, 57, 58

Keiji Fujiwara(Jose Rodriguez): Episodes 17, 18

Risa Mizuno(Julia): Episode 21

Nozomu Sasaki(The Great Sage/Jeneus): Episodes 23, 24, 55, 56

Emiri Katou(Doria): Episodes 25, 26

Tamaki Nakanishi(Lasagna): Episodes 25, 26

Yukana(Ulrike): Episodes 27, 28

Motoko Kumai(Greta): Episodes 29, 30

Katsuyuki Konishi(Shori Shibuya) Episodes 31, 49, 50

Toshiyuki Morikawa(Conrad/Engiwarudori(極楽鳥)): Episode 34

Hiroko Taguchi(Gisela): Episodes 35, 36

Akio Ōtsuka(Gwendal): Episodes 47, 48

Akira Ishida(Saralegi): Episodes 53, 54

Hiroaki Hirata(Gegenhuber): Episodes 59, 60

Games
Oresama Quest (おれさまクエスト)
Oresama Quest was a PC game released June 23, 2006.

Hajimari no Tabi (はじマりの旅)
Hajimari no Tabi was a PS2 action RPG video game developed and published by Namco Bandai. It was released in Japan on July 27, 2006. There were two versions released. The normal game and a premium box which included a drama CD and a booklet with an original story by Takabayashi Tomo.

Shin Makoku no Kyuujitsu (眞マ国の休日)
Shin Makoku no Kyuujitsu was a PS2 game released September 27, 2007. There were two versions released. The normal game and a limited box which included two figures, a script book and a drama CD.

References

Kyo Kara Maoh!